Zambrero is an Australian multinational fast food restaurant franchise serving Mexican cuisine. 

It was founded in Canberra by then-medical student Sam Prince with the idea of using the profits to support humanitarian causes. The chain donates a meal to someone in need in the developing world for every meal purchased through their Plate4Plate program.

Zambrero is one of Australia’s largest Mexican food franchise with over 245 restaurants globally.

Locations 

Zambrero opened its first restaurant in Lonsdale Street, Braddon in 2005, opening its 100th restaurant a decade later in Midland, Western Australia. Zambrero was recognised as one of Australia’s fastest growing franchises on the BRW Fastest Franchises List for 2011, 2012 and 2013 and Fast 100 List for 2014 and 2015. As of October 2019, Zambrero has 200 restaurants worldwide.  Zambrero opened its first restaurant in New Zealand in November 2014, in Dublin, Ireland in March 2016 and opened its first two restaurants in United States of America on 20 March 2018.  Zambrero opened its first restaurant in Raleigh, North Carolina in January 2020, and has continued its expansion in the area to include Durham and Cary, NC. Another location was added in Cincinnati, Ohio in February 2022.

Philanthropy 
In conjunction with partner organisation Rise Against Hunger, Zambrero's Plate 4 Plate initiative have donated 50,000,000 meals.

The company had shifted from an earlier goal of supplying educational resources to indigenous communities and developing countries, for which Prince had founded the E-magine Foundation in 2007, to reducing global hunger.

Accolades 
Zambrero won the “Australian Business Awards Enterprise of the Year” award in 2015  and in 2016 the QSR Media “Best Corporate Social Responsibility Initiative” and “Best Sustainability Initiative” awards.  Bianca Azzopardi, CEO of Zambrero was awarded the “Rising Star” award at the 2018 QSR Media awards.

Nutrition

A 2016 study by the George Institute for Global Health, analysing 229 small meals and snacks from 25 fast food chains, found Zambrero's pork nachos to have the highest kilojoule count.

See also

List of restaurants in Australia
List of Mexican restaurants

References

Fast-food franchises
Fast-food chains of Australia
Companies established in 2003
Restaurants established in 2003
2003 establishments in Australia
Fast-food Mexican restaurants
Companies based in Canberra